Conon (gen.: Κόνωνος) was a Greek grammarian and mythographer of the age of Augustus (who lived 63 BC – 14 AD), the author of a work titled  (Narrations), addressed to Archelaus Philopator, king of Cappadocia. It was a collection of fifty narratives relating to the mythical and heroic period, and especially the foundation of colonies.

An epitome of the work was preserved in the Bibliotheca of Photius, the 9th-century patriarch of Constantinople. Photius commends Conon's Attic style, and remarks that Nicolaus Damascenus borrowed much from him. There are separate editions of this abstract by Gale, by Teucher, and Kanne.

Dion Chrysostom mentions a rhetorician of this name, who may possibly be identical.

Notes

Sources 
 Conon, Fifty Narrations English translation by Brady Kiesling
 Text in Greek and translation to French by Abbé GEDOYN

External links 
 English translation of the Narrations by John Brady Kiesling for ToposText

1st-century BC Greek people
Ancient Greek grammarians
Ancient Greek mythographers
Atticists (grammarians)
Cappadocia (Roman province)
Roman-era Athenians